George Barger FRS FRSE FCS LLD (4 April 1878 – 5 January 1939) was a British chemist.

Life
He was born to an English mother, Eleanor Higginbotham,  and Gerrit Barger, a Dutch engineer in Manchester, England.

He was educated at Utrecht and The Hague High School. He subsequently attended King's College, Cambridge for his undergraduate degree and University College London to do a doctorate of science. His main work focused on the study of alkaloids and investigations of simple nitrogenous compounds of biological importance. Barger identified tyramine as one of the compounds responsible for the biological activity of ergot extracts. He also made significant contributions to the synthesis of thyroxine. and vitamin B1

In 1936 and 1937 he worked with Joseph John Blackie searching for materials for research.

Barger was elected a Fellow of the Royal Society in May, 1919 and awarded their Davy Medal in 1938.

Barger was married to Florence Emily Thomas in 1904 and had two sons and one daughter.

He died at Aeschi, Switzerland.

Positions
 Regius Professor of Chemistry, University of Glasgow, 1937–1939
 Professor of chemistry in relation to medicine, University of Edinburgh, 1919–1937
 Professor of chemistry, Royal Holloway College, University of London, 1913–1914
 Head of Chemical Department, Goldsmiths' College, 1909–1913
 Fellow of King's College, Cambridge, 1903–1909

Publications

Some Applications of Organic Chemistry to Biology and Chemistry (1930)
Organic Chemistry for Medical Students (1932)

References

Bibliography

 Britons discover synthetic thyroxin, T.R. Ybarra, New York Times, Sunday 12 December 1927

1878 births
1939 deaths
Scientists from Manchester
Academics of Goldsmiths, University of London
Academics of Royal Holloway, University of London
Academics of the University of Edinburgh
Academics of the University of Glasgow
British chemists
Alumni of King's College, Cambridge
Fellows of King's College, Cambridge
Fellows of the Royal Society
Fellows of the Chemical Society
People associated with Royal Holloway, University of London
Regius Professors
Members of the Göttingen Academy of Sciences and Humanities